Warehouse 13 is a supernatural fantasy television series created by Jane Espenson and D. Brent Mote. The show premiered on Syfy on July 7, 2009.

The series follows United States Secret Service Agents Myka Bering (Joanne Kelly) and Peter Lattimer (Eddie McClintock) when they are assigned to the government's secret Warehouse 13, which houses supernatural "artifacts". It is located in a barren landscape in South Dakota, and they initially regard the assignment as punishment. As they go about their assignments to retrieve missing Warehouse 13 artifacts and investigate reports of new ones, they come to understand the importance of what they are doing.

Series overview

Episodes

Season 1 (2009)

Season 2 (2010)

Season 3 (2011)

Season 4 (2012–13)

Season 5 (2014)

Webisodes 
There are two sets of webisodes. These episodes use some graphic art styles, which are a departure from the regular show. The first series, titled Of Monsters and Men, uses a comic book style with ten chapters, including a bonus chapter, while the second series, titled Grand Designs, features a steam-punk theme, which also has ten chapters.

Of Monsters and Men (2011)

Grand Designs (2012)

References 

General references

External links

 
 
 

 
Warehouse 13